Campionato Primavera 3, formerly Campionato Nazionale Dante Berretti (or simply Campionato Berretti), is an Italian football competition played by youth teams (under 19) organized by the Lega Pro, and mainly composed by Serie C clubs but also by some Serie A and Serie B teams. The first edition was held in the 1966–67 season for Serie C clubs only, but the competition was opened to other series' clubs in the 1968–69; since there the championship awarded multiple winning trophies, usually one for Serie C champion and one for the other categories' champion. From 1996–97 to 2003–04, only one winner was awarded.

Format
In 2011–12 season, the age limited was age 19 (calendar age) at the end of competition (born on or after 1 January 1993), one year below Primavera (born 1992). In 2012–13 Primavera had changed its age limited to age 19 (calendar age) at the end of competition, matching Berretti's 19. In 2020, the tournament was reduced to 30 clubs, following the transformation in Primavera3.

Past winners

Torneo "Dante Berretti"

Campionato Nazionale Juniores Torneo "Dante Berretti"

Campionato Nazionale "Dante Berretti"

See also
Campionato Nazionale Primavera
Serie A
Serie B
Serie C

References 

Youth football competitions in Italy
Under-20 association football